The Ron James Show is a Canadian television comedy show, which debuted on CBC Television on September 25, 2009.

Starring comedian Ron James, the show intersperses filmed and stage sketches with clips of James performing his stand-up routine. One of the show's more noted features is L'il Ronnie James, an animated recurring sketch which depicts James as a young child growing up in Cape Breton in the vein of Terry Gilliam's animation style.

On March 11, 2014, Ron James announced online that the show had been cancelled.

Voice Actors L'il Ronnie
Seasons 1-5

Ratings

Season One

Season Two

Season Three

Season Four

Season Five

References

External links

 
 

CBC Television original programming
2009 Canadian television series debuts
2014 Canadian television series endings
2000s Canadian sketch comedy television series
2010s Canadian sketch comedy television series